Shamsul Wares (born 21 January 1946) is a Bangladeshi architect who worked under the American architect Louis I. Kahn and his associate, Mazharul Islam.

Wares served as a faculty in the Department of Architecture, Bangladesh University of Engineering and Technology (BUET) from February, 1972 to February, 2003. He served as a Professor of Architecture and Dean of the faculty of Environmental Science and Design at University of Asia Pacific (UAP) from March, 2003 to April, 2015. Currently, he is the Dean of the School of Science and Technology at the State University of Bangladesh.

Wares has designed many residential, institutional and public buildings. He has served as president of the Institute of Architects Bangladesh (IAB) for two terms and has led the Bangladesh delegation at five ARCASIA meetings. He was awarded the Life Time Achievement Award for Architectural Education by the institute in 2009. He also serves as a technical advisor to a number of Bangladesh government organizations including the Ministry of Public Works, Ministry of Cultural Affairs, Dhaka University, Export Promotion Bureau, etc.

He was also featured in the acclaimed documentary "My Architect: A son's Journey", based on Louis I Kahn.

Projects 
 Vacation House, Vurulia, Gazipur, Bangladesh.

Awards 
 IAB Gold Medal (2017)

References

1946 births
Bangladeshi architects
Living people